A number of steamships were named Bibury, including:

, a British cargo ship in service 1929–40
, a British cargo ship in service 1946–51

Ship names